Cedrick Wilson Sr. (born December 17, 1978) is a former American football wide receiver in the National Football League (NFL). He was drafted by the San Francisco 49ers in the sixth round of the 2001 NFL Draft. He was picked up by the Pittsburgh Steelers in 2005. Wilson earned a Super Bowl ring with the Pittsburgh Steelers in Super Bowl XL, beating the Seattle Seahawks. With that achievement, he became one of very few football players to earn a championship ring at all three levels of football - high school,  college,  and professional.

Early years

Wilson played high school football at Melrose High School, in Memphis, where he earned a state championship in 1997 as the starting quarterback topping off a 12–3 record. In high school, he was teammates with Kindal Moorehead, who made it to the NFL and played for the Carolina Panthers and the Atlanta Falcons.He was also teammates with Andre Lott in high school and in college, who also won the National Championship and was drafted by Washington.

College career
Wilson played college football at Tennessee under head coach Phillip Fulmer. Wilson played with the Volunteers from 1997 to 2000. At the University of Tennessee, he converted to the wide receiver position from quarterback. He earned a national championship in the 1999 Fiesta Bowl defeating Florida State by a score of 23–16, topping off an undefeated season, 13–0.

Professional career

San Francisco 49ers
Wilson was drafted in the sixth round with the 169th overall pick of the 2001 NFL Draft by the San Francisco 49ers.  After being used primarily as a kick returner in 2001, Wilson's role in the San Francisco offense expanded throughout the next three seasons. Wilson posted career highs in receptions (47), receiving yards (641), and receiving touchdowns (3) for the San Francisco 49ers in 2004.

Pittsburgh Steelers
On March 8, 2005, Wilson signed with the Pittsburgh Steelers and had considerably less success in the 2005 regular season.

Wilson's breakout for the Steelers came during the 2005 NFL playoffs. Having caught only 26 passes for 461 yards and two touchdowns during the regular season, Wilson became a reliable option for the Steelers on their path to Super Bowl XL. In the Wildcard Round against the Cincinnati Bengals, he had three receptions for 104 yards. In the AFC Championship against the Denver Broncos, he had five receptions for 92 yards. In the Super Bowl against the Seattle Seahawks, Wilson had one reception for 20 yards on three targets.

Assault incident
Wilson was charged with assaulting his ex-girlfriend at a Pittsburgh restaurant on March 19, 2008. According to the complaint, Wilson allegedly entered the restaurant and, upon seeing his ex-girlfriend, approached her, pushed her and punched her in the face. Wilson was to be arraigned on charges of simple assault, harassment, and disorderly conduct.

On March 20, 2008, the Steelers released Wilson just hours after the incident. The next day, Wilson's ex-girlfriend said Wilson only pushed her, not punched. She added, "It was misconstrued apparently by the people around us."

Personal life
In 2008, Wilson began serving as offensive coordinator at Douglass High School in Memphis, Tennessee. Dee Montgomery, Wilson's former coach at Melrose High School, is also on the staff.

Wilson's son, Cedrick Wilson Jr., is currently a wide receiver for the Miami Dolphins of the National Football League.

Wilson later moved to White Station High School in Memphis as a volunteer coach, and became a substitute physical education teacher in the Memphis City Schools system.  However, in October 2012, Wilson was indicted on federal charges of fraud for hiring two people to take his teacher certification exams in his place. This was part of a massive scam orchestrated by longtime Memphis educator Clarence Mumford in which dozens of teachers in Tennessee, Mississippi, and Arkansas paid Mumford as much as $3,000 to hire people to take teacher certification exams for them.
Cedrick is now the head football coach at Melrose, his old high school.

References

1978 births
Living people
American football wide receivers
Pittsburgh Steelers players
Players of American football from Memphis, Tennessee
San Francisco 49ers players
Tennessee Volunteers football players